Walmir Alberto Valle (14 April 1938 – 26 August 2019) was a Brazilian Roman Catholic bishop.

Valle was born in Brazil and was ordained to the priesthood in 1963. He served as bishop of the Roman Catholic Diocese of Zé Doca, Brazil, from 1991 to 2002. Valle then served as coadjutor bishop of the Roman Catholic Diocese of Joaçaba, Brazil, in 2002 and 2003. He served as bishop of the Joaçaba Diocese from 2003 until 2010.

Notes

1938 births
2019 deaths
20th-century Roman Catholic bishops in Brazil
21st-century Roman Catholic bishops in Brazil
Roman Catholic bishops of Joaçaba
Roman Catholic bishops of Zé Doca